You'll Never Be Alone is a 2016 Chilean drama film directed by Álex Anwandter. It was shown in the Panorama section at the 66th Berlin International Film Festival. The film won a Jury Award from the Teddy Awards for LGBT-related feature films.

The film centres on Juan (Sergio Hernández), a shy factory worker struggling to pay the medical bills after his gay son is hospitalized in a gaybashing incident.

Plot
After his teenage gay son is violently attacked, Juan (Sergio Hernández), a withdrawn manager at a mannequin factory, is faced with a difficult choice between paying for the exorbitant medical costs of his son Pablo (Andrew Bargsted) and making a final attempt to become a partner with his boss. As Juan struggles to navigate through dead ends and unexpected betrayals, he discovers that the world he thought he knew is also ready to be violent with him. Although Juan has made many mistakes, he still has a chance to save his son.

Cast
 Antonia Zegers
 Sergio Hernández as Juan
 Gabriela Hernández as Lucy
 Andrew Bargsted as Pablo
 Edgardo Bruna as Bruno
 Astrid Roldan as Mari

References

External links
 

2016 films
2016 drama films
2016 LGBT-related films
2016 directorial debut films
2010s Spanish-language films
Chilean drama films
Chilean LGBT-related films
LGBT-related drama films
Homophobia in fiction
Films about violence against LGBT people
2010s Chilean films